Bastuck may refer to:

 Jörg Bastuck, a German race car driver
 Rainer Bastuck, a German race car driver and entrepreneur
 Bastuck & Co. GmbH, a German automotive company